Arne Torkildsen (14 September 1899 – 7 March 1968) was a Norwegian neurosurgeon. He described the surgical technique of ventriculocisternostomy (lateral ventricle to cisterna magna,; a predecessor of today's endoscopic third ventriculostomy), which is also called "Torkildsen's operation".

References

External links
Skeletons in the cupboard: the University of Oslo and Arne Torkildsen's academic career. - biographic article in the Journal of the Norwegian Medical Association.

Norwegian neurosurgeons
1899 births
1968 deaths
20th-century surgeons